Miha Goropevšek (born 12 March 1991) is a professional Slovenian football defender who plays for Ethnikos Achna.

Career
Goropevšek began his playing career with NK Šampion in the Slovenian Third League. He joined Polish club Legionovia Legionowo and in August 2015 signed a contract with the Ukrainian Premier League club FC Volyn.

References

External links 
 
 

1991 births
Living people
Sportspeople from Celje
Slovenian footballers
Association football defenders
Slovenian expatriate footballers
Expatriate footballers in Poland
Expatriate footballers in Ukraine
Expatriate footballers in Belarus
Expatriate footballers in Cyprus
Slovenian expatriate sportspeople in Ukraine
Slovenian expatriate sportspeople in Poland
Ukrainian Premier League players
Ukrainian First League players
NK Šampion players
Legionovia Legionowo players
FC Volyn Lutsk players
Olimpia Grudziądz players
FC Dinamo Minsk players
FC Chornomorets Odesa players
Ethnikos Achna FC players